Eustace Henry Taylor Cummings CBE (1890 – 1967) qualified as a doctor at Liverpool University and then served as a medical officer in Sierra Leone. He served as Mayor of Freetown from 1948 to 1954. His father, Emmanuel Cummings, was also a mayor of Freetown.

References
A Memorable Gathering of Sierra Leonians in London, 1919 Fyfe and Killingray Afr Aff (Lond).1989; 88: 41-46
Profile of Eustace Henry Taylor Cummings

1890 births
1967 deaths
Sierra Leone Creole people
Mayors of Freetown
People from Freetown